Koronis Pharmaceuticals is a Seattle area biotechnology company founded in 1998. Koronis is dedicated to the development of antiviral therapeutics based on a novel mechanism, Viral Decay Acceleration (VDA). The Company's lead product candidate is KP-1461 for the treatment of human immunodeficiency virus (HIV) infection. The company also has products in development for the treatment of hepatitis C and RSV infection.

References

 
 
 
 
 Paulson, Tom. "Conflicts Advance a Burgeoning Field Industry, Academia Now are Bedfellows."  Seattle P-I. May 19, 1999: A1. 
 Biotech Industry Driven By Evolution Searching For Cures, Companies Get Creative. Carol Smith P-I Reporter. Seattle P-I. May 17, 1999: A1. 
 Mature companies beat out new ones for VC cash. Romano, Benjamin J. Seattle Times. October 25, 2005: C1.

External links
 
 Reuters story on IPO prospects 

Biotechnology companies of the United States
Companies based in Seattle